

Engineering Colleges 
 Ammini College of Engineering, Kannampariyaram 
 Government Engineering College, Sreekrishnapuram
 NSS College of Engineering
 al ameen college of engineering

Arts and Science Colleges
 Government Victoria College, Palakkad
 Government College Chittur
 V V College of Science and Technology, Kanjikode
 NSS College, Nenmara
 SN College, Alathur

References

.

 
Palakkad